Ashmont Hill is an American urban contemporary gospel group from Boston, Massachusetts. The group consists of four members, Deborah Bullock, Wil Bullock, April Joy Mtyora, and Phil Thompson. In 2008, the group broke through on the Billboard magazine charts with their album Ashmont Hill that was released on May 13, 2008. They released Your Masterpiece in 2010, and it charted on the Billboard magazine Gospel Albums chart. The band released The Maze in 2013, yet this did not place on any Billboard magazine charts.

Background
The Boston, Massachusetts-based urban contemporary gospel quartet Ashmont Hill started in 2008, and they are made up of four members, Deborah Bullock, Wil Bullock, April Joy Mtyora, and Phil Thompson.

History
The quartet released Ashmont Hill with Comin Atcha Music, Inc. in 2008. This was their breakthrough release upon the Billboard magazine charts, and it placed on the Christian Albums chart at No. 16, Gospel Albums chart at No. 10, and No. 47 on the Independent Albums chart. Their second album, Your Masterpiece, released in 2010 by Axiom Records. It charted on the Gospel Albums chart at No. 5. The subsequent album, The Maze, was released in 2013, yet this time it did not chart.

Members
 Deborah Bullock
 Wil Bullock
 April Joy Mtyora
 Phil Thompson

Discography

Studio albums

References

External links
 Facebook
 Cross Rhythms artist profile

Musical groups established in 2008
American Christian musical groups
Musical groups from Boston
Musical quartets
American gospel musical groups
Performers of contemporary worship music
2008 establishments in Massachusetts